The 1959 NAIA football season was the fourth season of college football sponsored by the National Association of Intercollegiate Athletics. The season was played from August to December 1959, culminating in the fourth annual NAIA Football National Championship, played this year again at Stewart Field in St. Petersburg, Florida. During its four years in St. Petersburg, the game was called the Holiday Bowl.

Texas A&I defeated  in the championship game, 20–7, to win their first NAIA national title.

Conference standings

Postseason

See also
 1959 NCAA University Division football season
 1959 NCAA College Division football season

References

 
NAIA Football National Championship